Irving Leonard may refer to:

Irving A. Leonard (1896–1962), historian specialising in Hispanic history and art
Irving Leonard (financial adviser) (1915–1969), financial adviser to Hollywood film stars of the 1950s and 1960s